Jane Mejlvang (born 2 August 1995) is a Danish handball player who currently plays for Ringkøbing Håndbold.

References

1995 births
Living people
People from Ringkøbing-Skjern Municipality
Danish female handball players
Sportspeople from the Central Denmark Region